Högstadium ("high-stadium" or "upper stage") is a Swedish former term for the seventh to ninth grade (grundskola)  of the Swedish school system. Since 1994, it is no longer in official use, but the term is still used informally. After högstadiet ("the high-stadium"), there is no compulsory school attendance; however, most Swedish students go on to the gymnasium for three more years of studies. The term was also used for grades 7–9 in Finland from the 1970s and up to 1999.

The Norwegian equivalent is known as "Ungdomsskolen", covering grades 8th–10th.

References

Education in Sweden
Education in Finland
1994 disestablishments in Sweden
1999 disestablishments in Finland

fi:Peruskoulu#Opettajat ja koulutilat